Rochester may refer to:

Places

Australia 
 Rochester, Victoria

Canada 
 Rochester, Alberta

United Kingdom
Rochester, Kent 
City of Rochester-upon-Medway (1982–1998), district council area
History of Rochester, Kent
HM Prison Rochester, a Young Offenders Institution in Rochester
Rochester Castle, a medieval building in Rochester
Rochester Cathedral
Rochester (UK Parliament constituency), historical constituency
Rochester and Strood (UK Parliament constituency)
Rochester, Northumberland

United States 
 Rochester, Illinois
 Rochester, Indiana
 Rochester, Iowa
 Rochester, Kentucky
 Rochester, Massachusetts
 Rochester, Michigan
 Rochester, Minnesota, second largest city by population with the name Rochester
 Rochester, Missouri
 Rochester, Nevada
 Rochester, New Hampshire
 Rochester, New York, the largest city by population with the name Rochester
 Rochester, Ulster County, New York
 Rochester, Ohio (in Lorain County)
 Rochester, Noble County, Ohio
 Rochester, Pennsylvania
 Rochester, Texas
 Rochester, Vermont, a town
 Rochester (CDP), Vermont, the central village of the town
 Rochester, Washington
 Rochester, Wisconsin
 Rochester, Kansas, a township
 Rochester, North Dakota, a township
 Rochester, Montana

Ecclesiastical areas 
 Diocese of Rochester, within the Church of England Province of Canterbury, United Kingdom
 Roman Catholic Diocese of Rochester, New York, United States
 Episcopal Diocese of Rochester, New York, United States
 Roman Catholic Diocese of Winona-Rochester, Minnesota, United States

Events
 2014 Rochester and Strood by-election

People 
 Rochester (surname)
 John Wilmot, 2nd Earl of Rochester, 17th century English poet
 Eddie "Rochester" Anderson (1904–1977), American actor sometimes known as "Rochester", after his character "Rochester Van Jones" on The Jack Benny Program
 Baron Rochester
 Earl of Rochester

Fictional characters 
 Edward Fairfax Rochester, the male protagonist of Charlotte Brontë's novel Jane Eyre

Sports
Rochester Americans or Amerks, an American Hockey League team
Rochester Braves, a pro football (American) team in 1936 also known as the Syracuse Braves
Rochester Express, professional softball team, 1978-1982, originally named the Rochester Zeniths
Rochester Flash, an American Soccer League (1981-1983, 1984) and United Soccer League team
Rochester Honkers, a Northwoods League baseball team
Rochester Jeffersons, an original National Football League team
Rochester Knighthawks, a National Lacrosse League team
Rochester Lancers (1967–80), an American Soccer League (1967-1969) and North American Soccer League (1970-1980) team
Rochester Raiders, an indoor football team  
Rochester Rattlers, a Major League Lacrosse team
Rochester Red Wings, an International League baseball team
Rochester Rhinos, a soccer (football) club
Rochester Royals, a National Basketball Association team now known as the Sacramento Kings
Rochester Tigers, a pro football (American) team in 1936 also known as the Brooklyn Tigers 
Rochester United F.C., a football (soccer) club
Rochester Zeniths (basketball), a basketball team in the Continental Basketball Association (1977-1982)

Transport 
 HMS Rochester, the name of four ships of the Royal Navy
 USS Rochester, the name of three ships in the U.S. Navy

Rochester Airport
In the United States:
 Greater Rochester International Airport, in New York state
 Rochester International Airport, in Minnesota

In the United Kingdom:
 Rochester Airport (Kent), England

Companies 
 Rochester Products Division, former name of manufacturer of General Motors fuel system components (especially carburetors)

Educational establishments
 King's School, Rochester founded in 604 AD in Kent, UK
 Rochester City School District, New York, USA
 Rochester College, Michigan, USA
 Rochester Community Schools (disambiguation)
 Rochester Grammar School, Kent, UK
 Rochester High School (disambiguation)
 Rochester Institute of Technology, New York, USA
 Rochester Maths, Sir Joseph Williamson's Mathematical School, founded in 1701 in Kent, UK
 University Center Rochester, Minnesota, USA
 University of Minnesota Rochester, Minnesota, USA
 University of Rochester, New York, USA

See also 
 East Rochester (disambiguation)
 Greater Rochester (disambiguation)
 Rochester Hills, Michigan
 Rochester Sentinel (disambiguation)
 Rochester Township (disambiguation)
 Rocester